Williams is an impact crater on Mars, located in the Memnonia quadrangle at 18.7°S latitude and 164.3°W longitude. It measures  in diameter and was named after British astronomer Arthur S. Williams. The name was approved by IAU's Working Group for Planetary System Nomenclature in 1973.

See also 
 List of craters on Mars

References 

Memnonia quadrangle
Impact craters on Mars